Denis Istomin and Evgeny Kirillov were the defending champions, but only Kirillov started this year.
He partnered up with Michail Elgin and this pair won the tournament, after defeating Alexey Kedryuk and Denis Matsukevich 6–1, 6–2 in the final.

Seeds

Draw

Quarterfinals, semifinals, final

References
 Doubles Draw

Mordovia Cup - Doubles
Mordovia Cup
2009 in Russian tennis